Shelby Park may refer to:

Shelby Park, Louisville, Kentucky, USA
Shelby Park (Nashville), Tennessee, USA